Naches is a name used in Washington state, U.S.A. The name may refer to:
Naches, Washington
Naches River
Naches Pass
Naches Peak
Naches Trail

See also 
 Natchez (disambiguation)
Naches (Yiddish)